Samat Zhanatuly Zharynbetov (Samat Janatūly Jarynbetov; born 4 January 1994) is a Kazakhstani professional footballer who plays for FC Tobol.

International career
He made his debut for the Kazakhstan national football team on 4 September 2021 in a World Cup qualifier against Finland, a 0–1 away loss. He substituted Georgy Zhukov in the 81st minute.

References

External links
 
 

1994 births
People from Pavlodar Region
Living people
Kazakhstani footballers
Kazakhstan international footballers
Association football midfielders
FC Ekibastuz players
FC Tobol players
Kazakhstan First Division players
Kazakhstan Premier League players